Robin Hranáč (born 29 January 2000) is a Czech footballer who plays for Pardubice as a defender.

Club career

MFK Tatran Liptovský Mikuláš
Hranáč made his Fortuna Liga debut for Tatran Liptovský Mikuláš against Slovan Bratislava on 24 July 2021.

References

External links
 MFK Tatran Liptovský Mikuláš official club profile 
 
 
 Futbalnet profile 

2000 births
Living people
Sportspeople from Plzeň
Czech footballers
Czech Republic under-21 international footballers
Association football defenders
FC Viktoria Plzeň players
MFK Tatran Liptovský Mikuláš players
FK Pardubice players
Bohemian Football League players
Czech First League players
Slovak Super Liga players
Czech National Football League players
Expatriate footballers in Slovakia
Czech expatriate sportspeople in Slovakia